Biological systems engineering or Biosystems engineering is a broad-based engineering discipline with particular emphasis on non-medical biology. It can be thought of as a subset of the broader notion of biological engineering or bio-technology though not in the respects that pertain to biomedical engineering as biosystems engineering tends to focus less on medical applications than on agriculture, ecosystems, and food science. The discipline focuses broadly on environmentally sound and sustainable engineering solutions to meet societies' ecologically-related needs. Biosystems engineering integrates the expertise of fundamental engineering fields with expertise from non-engineering disciplines.

Background and organization
Many college and university biological engineering departments have a history of being grounded in agricultural engineering and have only in the past two decades or so changed their names to reflect the movement towards more diverse biological based engineering programs.  This major is sometimes called agricultural and biological engineering, biological and environmental engineering, etc., in different universities, generally reflecting interests of local employment opportunities.

Since biological engineering covers a wide spectrum, many departments now offer specialization options. Depending on the department and the specialization options offered within each program, curricula may overlap with other related fields. There are a number of different titles for BSE-related departments at various universities.  The professional societies commonly associated with many Biological Engineering programs include the American Society of Agricultural and Biological Engineers (ASABE) and the  Institute of Biological Engineering (IBE), which generally encompasses BSE.  Some program also participate in the Biomedical Engineering Society (BMES)  and the American Institute of Chemical Engineers (AIChE).

A biological systems engineer has a background in what both environmental engineers and biologists do, thus bridging the gap between engineering and the (non-medical) biological sciences – although this is variable across academic institutions.   For this reason, biological systems engineers are becoming integral parts of many environmental engineering firms, federal agencies, and biotechnology industries.  A biological systems engineer will often address the solution to a problem from the perspective of employing living systems to enact change.  For example, biological treatment methodologies can be applied to provide access to clean drinking water  or for sequestration of carbon dioxide.

Specializations 
Land and water resources engineering
Food engineering and bioprocess engineering 
Machinery systems engineering
Natural resources and environmental engineering
Biomedical engineering

Academic programs in agricultural and biological systems engineering
Below is a listing of known academic programs that offer bachelor's degrees (B.S. or B.S.E.) in what ABET and/or ASABE terms "agricultural engineering", "biological systems engineering", "biological engineering", or similarly named programs.  ABET accredits college and university programs in the disciplines of applied science, computing, engineering, and engineering technology. ASABE defines accredited programs within the scope of  Ag/Bio Engineering.

North America

Central and South America

Europe

Asia

Africa

See also 

Related engineering fields
Agricultural engineering
Aquaculture engineering
Biological engineering
Biomedical engineering
Civil engineering
Chemical engineering
Ecological engineering
Environmental engineering
Food engineering
Hydraulic engineering
Mechanical engineering
Sanitary engineering

Closely related sciences
Agriculture
Animal Science
Biology, Biochemistry, Microbiology
Chemistry
Ecology
Environmental science
Forestry
Horticulture
Hydrology
Plant Science
Soil science

References

Further reading 
 2003, Dennis R. Heldman (ed), Encyclopedia of agricultural, food, and biological engineering.
 2002, Teruyuki Nagamune, Tai Hyun Park & Mark R. Marten (ed), Biological Systems Engineering, Washington, D.C. : American Chemical Society, 320 pages.
 2012, Paige Brown Jarreau, What is Biological Engineering, http://www.scilogs.com/from_the_lab_bench/what-is-biological-engineering-ibe-2012/

External links
UC San Diego, Department of Bioengineering, UCSD BE part of University of California, San Diego

Biological engineering
Biological systems
Systems biology
Systems engineering